Flood IO is a load testing platform that executes globally-distributed performance tests from open source tools, including JMeter, Gatling, and Selenium. It also runs test plans written with Ruby JMeter, an open source RubyGem.

Tricentis Flood
Flood is SaaS load testing service that runs existing test scripts across a globally-distributed grid infrastructure.  It was  built with a shared nothing architecture and integrates with AWS and Azure.  Users can generate over 1 million globally-distributed requests per second without manually setting up the associated infrastructure or correlating the distributed results. The service provides detailed analysis reports and real-time monitoring.

In July 2017, Flood IO was acquired by Tricentis and now goes by the name Tricentis Flood

Ruby JMeter
Ruby JMeter is a RubyGem that lets users write test plans for JMeter in any text editor with an expressive domain-specific language for communication with JMeter.  It also includes API integration with Flood. Ruby JMeter is licensed as open-source software under the MIT License, which means it permits reuse within proprietary software provided that all copies of the licensed software include a copy of the MIT License terms and the copyright notice.

Flood Element
Flood Element is a load generation tool which uses the Google Chrome web browser to generate load on a web application by spawning thousands of browser instances and running a predefined test script to simulate a series of user interactions. Flood Element test scripts are written in TypeScript and follow a similar syntax to Selenium.

See also

 Load testing tools
Performance Engineering
JMeter
Gatling
Selenium
Software performance testing
Software testing
Web server benchmarking

References

External links
 Flood home page

Load testing tools
Software testing tools